The Church of St. Adalbert or the Church of St. Wojciech in Poznań, Poland, was constructed in the 15th century. It was the one of only two Polish churches under the Nazis (1939–1944). The church has a 16th-century wooden belfry.

Burials
 Józef Wybicki
Andrzej Niegolewski
 Feliks Nowowiejski
 Tadeusz Szeligowski
 Stefan Bolesław Poradowski
 Paweł Edmund Strzelecki
 Jan Henryk Dąbrowski
 Florian Marciniak

References

External links

St. Adalbert's Parish
St. Adalbert's Church

Adalbert
Gothic architecture in Poland